Xiangyang Subdistrict is a subdistrict in Longcheng District, Chaoyang, Liaoning, China. , it has 4 residential communities under its administration.

See also 
 List of township-level divisions of Liaoning

References 

Township-level divisions of Liaoning
Chaoyang, Liaoning